Ivan Lendl (born March 7, 1960) is a Czech–American former professional tennis player. He is widely regarded as one of the greatest tennis players of all time. Lendl was ranked world No. 1 in singles for 270 weeks and won 94 singles titles. He won eight major singles titles and was runner-up a joint record 11 times (tied with Roger Federer and Novak Djokovic), making him the first man to contest 19 major finals. Lendl also contested a record eight consecutive US Open finals, and won seven year-end championships.

Lendl is the only man in professional tennis history to have a match winning percentage of over 90% in five different years (1982, 1985, 1986, 1987, and 1989). He also had a comfortable head-to-head winning record against his biggest rivals, which translates to a 22–13 record (4–3 in major matches) against Jimmy Connors and a 21–15 record (7–3 in major matches) against John McEnroe.

Lendl's dominance of his era was the most evident at the year-end championships, which feature the eight best-ranked singles players. He holds a win–loss record at the event of 39–10, having contested the final nine consecutive times, a record.

Commonly referred to as the 'Father Of Modern Tennis' and 'The Father Of The Inside-Out Forehand', Lendl pioneered a new style of tennis; his game was built around his forehand, hit hard and with a heavy topspin, and his success is cited as a primary influence in popularizing the now-common playing style of aggressive baseline power tennis. After retirement, he became a tennis coach for several players; in particular, he helped Andy Murray win three major titles and reach the world No. 1 ranking.

Tennis career

Early life and career
Lendl was born into a tennis family in Ostrava, Czechoslovakia (now the Czech Republic). His parents were top players in Czechoslovakia, and his mother Olga, born Jeništová, was at one point ranked the no. 2 female player in the country.

Lendl first came to the tennis world's attention as a junior player. In 1978, he won the boys' singles titles at both the French Open and Wimbledon and was the world No. 1 ranked junior player.

Lendl turned professional in 1978. After reaching his first top-level singles final in 1979, he won seven singles titles in 1980, including three tournament wins in three consecutive weeks. Lendl was part of Czechoslovakia's Davis Cup winning team that year. He was the driving force behind the country's team in the first half of the 1980s, and was also part of the Czechoslovak team that won the World Team Cup in 1981 and was runner-up in 1984 and 1985. However, he stopped playing in these events after he moved to the United States in 1986 because Czechoslovakia's Tennis Association viewed him as an "illegal defector" from their country.

The success continued in 1981, as he won ten titles, including his first season-ending Masters Grand Prix tour title, defeating Vitas Gerulaitis in five sets. He relocated to the United States in 1981, first living at the home of mentor and friend, Wojtek Fibak.

In 1982, he won 15 of the 23 singles tournaments he entered and had a 44-match winning streak.

Lendl competed on the World Championship Tennis (WCT) tour, where he won all ten tournaments he entered, including his first WCT Finals, where he defeated John McEnroe in straight sets. He faced McEnroe again in the Masters Grand Prix final and won in straight sets to claim his second season-ending championship of the WCT. In an era when tournament prize money was rising sharply due to the competition between two circuits (Grand Prix and WCT), Lendl's title victories quickly made him the highest-earning tennis player of all time.

Lendl won another seven tournaments in 1983; however, he had not won any Grand Slam titles in the early years of his career. He reached his first Grand Slam final at the French Open in 1981, where he lost in five sets to Björn Borg. Lendl's second came at the US Open in 1982, where he was defeated by Jimmy Connors. In 1983, he was the runner-up at both the Australian Open and the US Open.

In July 1983, Lendl played three exhibition matches (against Johan Kriek, Kevin Curren, and Jimmy Connors) in Sun City, South Africa, in the apartheid-era bantustan of Bophuthatswana. The Czechoslovak Sport Federation (ČSTV), controlled by the Communist Party, expelled him from the Czechoslovak Davis Cup team and fined him $150,000. Lendl disputed the punishment and the fine.

Prime years

In 1984, Lendl bought his own house in Greenwich, Connecticut. Lendl's first Grand Slam title came at the 1984 French Open, where he defeated McEnroe in a long final. Down two sets to love, and trailing 4–2 in the fourth set, Lendl came back to claim the title 3–6, 2–6, 6–4, 7–5, 7–5. McEnroe subsequently beat Lendl in straight sets in both finals of the US Open 1984 and Volvo Masters 1984 (played in January 1985).

Lendl lost in the final of the 1985 French Open to Mats Wilander. He then faced McEnroe again in the final of the US Open, winning in straight sets. It was the first of three consecutive US Open titles for Lendl and part of a run of eight consecutive US Open finals. He reached the WCT Finals for the second and last time, defeating Tim Mayotte in three sets. He also won the Masters Grand Prix title for the third time, defeating Boris Becker in straight sets.

He won French Open titles in 1986 and 1987, as well as the season-ending 1986 and 1987 Masters Grand Prix championship titles, where he defeated Becker (1986) in straight sets and Wilander (1987) in three sets. This took him to his fifth and last Grand Prix year-end tour title.

In each year from 1985 through 1987, Lendl's match-winning percentage was over 90%. This record was equalled by Roger Federer in 2004–2006, but Lendl remains the only male tennis player with over 90% match wins in five different years (1982 was the first, 1989 the last). From the 1985 US Open to the 1988 Australian Open, Lendl reached ten consecutive Grand Slam singles semifinals — a record that was broken by Federer at the 2007 Australian Open.

Lendl began 1989 by winning his first Australian Open title with a straight sets final victory over Miloslav Mečíř, and went on to win 10 titles out of 17 tournaments he entered. Lendl successfully defended his Australian Open title in 1990.

The only Grand Slam singles title Lendl never managed to win was Wimbledon. After reaching the semi-finals in 1983 and 1984, he reached the final twice, losing in straight sets to Becker in 1986 and Pat Cash in 1987. He reached the semi-finals in 1988 and 1989, but lost to Becker on both occasions. In 1990, Lendl put in intensive efforts to train and improve his grass court game. He switched to a larger headed racket and skipped the 1990 French Open in order to spend more time practising on grass. He won the Queen's Club Championships, with comfortable straight-set victories over McEnroe in the semi-final and Becker in the final, but was unable to reproduce this form at Wimbledon, and although he reached the semi-finals for the seventh time in eight years, he lost to eventual champion Stefan Edberg in straight sets.

Later career
Lendl remained near the top of the rankings in 1991. He skipped the French Open again to focus on Wimbledon, but lost in the third round against David Wheaton, and was never to win the Wimbledon title. The Australian Open in January that year, where he lost in four sets to Becker, was his last Grand Slam final.

Lendl was well known for his meticulous and intensive training and physical conditioning regime, and his scientific approach to preparation and playing. As part of his preparations for the US Open, he hired the same workers who laid the hardcourt surfaces at Flushing Meadows each year to install an exact copy in the grounds of his home in Greenwich, Connecticut.

Lendl announced his retirement from professional tennis on December 21, 1994, aged 34, due to chronic back pain. His last professional match prior to that had been his defeat in the second round of the US Open in 1994, three and a half months earlier.

Lendl won a career total of 94 ATP singles titles (plus 57 other non-ATP tournaments, a total of 151 singles titles) and 6 doubles titles, and his career total prize money of U.S. $21,262,417 was a record at the time. In 2001, he was inducted into the International Tennis Hall of Fame.

Return to the court
On April 10, 2010, Lendl returned to play in the Caesars Tennis Classic exhibition match in Atlantic City, New Jersey, against his rival from the late 1980s, Mats Wilander, his first tournament since his retirement in 1994. He lost the one-set match 3–6.

On February 28, 2011, Lendl returned to the court again in an exhibition match against McEnroe at Madison Square Garden in New York City. It was planned to be a one-set, first-to-eight event. However, McEnroe, leading 6–3, injured his ankle and had to retire from the match.

In May 2012, Lendl played in Prague in the 2012 Sparta Prague Open tournament. He defeated fellow Czech Jiří Novák in the exhibition match.

Coaching career

On December 31, 2011, Lendl was appointed to coach Andy Murray. Lendl has been credited with improving Murray's maturity and consistency, guiding him to his first two Grand Slam victories in the 2012 US Open and 2013 Wimbledon Championships. On winning the US Open in 2012, Murray became the second player in the Open Era, after Lendl, to have lost their first four Grand Slam finals, and won the fifth. On March 19, 2014, it was announced that Lendl and Murray would be ending their two-year coaching partnership.

On June 12, 2016, Lendl rejoined Andy Murray's coaching team. By the end of 2016, Murray had become world No. 1, having won his second Wimbledon title, third major championship overall, second Olympic gold medal in singles, and his first ATP World Tour Finals title, defeating Novak Djokovic.

In August 2018, Lendl joined Alexander Zverev's team. They split up in July 2019 due to disappointing results in 2019 and personal differences. Zverev has stated that Lendl was more interested in his dog or his golf game than in professional coaching.

Playing style

Nicknamed "The Terminator" and "Ivan the Terrible", Lendl's forehand was hit hard and with topspin, which allowed him to dictate from the back of the court. His trademark shot was his running forehand, which he could direct either down the line or cross-court.

Early in his career, Lendl played a sliced backhand, but in the early 1980s he learned to hit his backhand with significant topspin. This shift allowed him to defeat John McEnroe in 1984 in the French Open, Lendl's first Grand Slam victory. In the first two sets, McEnroe used his habitual proximity to the net to intercept Lendl's cross-court passing shots. In the third set, Lendl started using lobs, forcing McEnroe to distance himself from the net to prepare for the lobs. McEnroe's further distance from the net opened the angles for Lendl's cross-court passing shots, which ultimately gained Lendl points and turned the match around.

Equipment
At the beginning of his professional career, Lendl used Adidas clothing and Kneissl rackets, subsequently changing to Adidas rackets. Toward the end of his days on the ATP tour, Lendl ended his long-term clothing, shoe, and racket deal with Adidas. He signed with Mizuno, and finally began to play with a mid-sized racket very similar to the Adidas racket he had used throughout most of his career, itself based on the Kneissl White Star model. Since 2010, he has been using Bosworth rackets.

Career statistics

Grand Slam tournament performance timeline

Grand Slam finals

Lendl reached 19 Grand Slam singles finals in his career. He won eight titles, and was a runner-up in 11.

Records

All-time
 These records cover the entire period of tennis from 1877.

Open Era
 These records were attained in the Open Era of tennis.
 Combined year end championships are: WCT Finals and Masters Grand Prix
 Records in bold indicate peer-less achievements.

Awards and recognition
Lendl was the International Tennis Federation's World Champion on four occasions (1985, 1986, 1987, 1990) and the Association of Tennis Professionals (ATP) Player of The Year three times (1985, 1986, 1987). Earlier in his career, he was also named ATP Most Improved Player, in 1981.

Due to his achievements, Lendl is often considered among the greatest tennis players in the sport's history. In his book Modern Encyclopedia of Tennis, Bud Collins included Lendl in his list of the greatest men's tennis players of the period 1946–1992. Tennis magazine described Lendl as "the game's greatest overachiever" in its 40th anniversary series. In 1986, North Korea issued a postage stamp featuring Lendl.

Personal life

US citizenship
Lendl successfully applied for a U.S. Permanent Resident Card in 1987, hoping to obtain U.S. citizenship in time to represent the US in the 1988 Olympic Games and in the Davis Cup. A bill in Congress to bypass the traditional five-year waiting procedure was rejected in 1988 because Czechoslovak authorities refused to provide the necessary waivers. He became a U.S. citizen on July 7, 1992.

Family
On September 16, 1989, six days after competing in the final of the US Open versus  Boris Becker, Lendl married Samantha Frankel. They have five daughters: Marika, twins Isabelle and Caroline, Daniela, and Nikola. Two of his daughters (Marika and Isabelle) were members of the University of Florida Women's Golf Team. Daniela was a member of the University of Alabama Women's Golf Team. His daughter Caroline was a part of the University of Alabama Women's Rowing Team for the 2011–2012 academic year, and his daughter Nikola was an instructor at SoulCycle.

Other activities
After finishing his tennis career in 1994, Lendl took up golf, reaching a handicap of 0 and achieving a win on the Celebrity Tour. Lendl has played in the Gary Player Invitational charity Pro-Am several times, and organized a charity competition in 2004 called the Ivan Lendl Celebrity Golf Tournament. Still competitive at the mini-tour levels, Lendl now spends much of his time managing his daughters' golfing careers.

Lendl had a nearly complete collection of posters by Alfons Mucha. The collection was exhibited in Prague in 2013. He sold the collection in 2014 to Czech businessman Richard Fuxa for 3.5 million dollars.

See also

 List of ATP number 1 ranked singles players
 World number 1 male tennis player rankings
 Lendl–McEnroe rivalry
 Lendl–Wilander rivalry
 Tennis male players statistics
 All-time tennis records – men's singles
 Open Era tennis records – men's singles

Notes

References

Further reading
 Jiri Janousek, Pavel Vitous (1990). Ivan Lendl. Praha, Czechoslovakia: Lidove nakladatelstvi. .  .
 Ivan Lendl, George Mendoza (1986). Hitting Hot: Ivan Lendl's 14-day Tennis Clinic. New York: Random House. .

External links

 
 
 
 

1960 births
Living people
American male tennis players 
American people of Czech descent
American people of Moravian descent
Australian Open (tennis) champions
Czech male tennis players
Czechoslovak defectors
Czechoslovak emigrants to the United States
Czechoslovak male tennis players
French Open champions
French Open junior champions
Grand Slam (tennis) champions in men's singles
Hopman Cup competitors
International Tennis Hall of Fame inductees
Naturalized citizens of the United States
Sportspeople from Greenwich, Connecticut
Sportspeople from Ostrava
Tennis people from Connecticut
US Open (tennis) champions
Wimbledon junior champions
American tennis coaches
Andy Murray
People from Goshen, Connecticut
Grand Slam (tennis) champions in boys' singles
People from Vero Beach, Florida
ATP number 1 ranked singles tennis players
ITF World Champions
Recipients of Medal of Merit (Czech Republic)